Billiard champions in Pakistan are performing their best to achieve global competition win.   Naveen Perwani is a well-known Pakistani Snooker player.

Sindh Snooker Cup is organized for the development of Snooker players in Pakistan.

History
The Pakistan Billiard & Snooker Federation was formed in 1958 and is the national sports governing body for Billiards and Snooker.

Events
Pakistan Billiards and Snooker Federation organizes snooker series. Pakistan hosted the 2012 Asian 6-red ball Championship in Karachi,  which was organized by the Pakistan Billiards and Snooker Association (PBSA) which also submitted bid for hosting 2015 6-Red World Cup. Pankaj Advani defeated Yan Bingtao of China in the World 6Reds event held at Karachi. at the event Maxim Cassis  Vice President of International Billiards and Snooker Federation (ISBSF) commented that 'Pakistan is land of World Snooker Champions.' 

Pakistan national team decided to participate in the 4th Asian Team Championship and 5th Six Red Snooker Championship which will be held in Abu Dhabi, United Arab Emirates.

References

Sport in Pakistan by sport